Dutch Crossing is an interdisciplinary peer-reviewed academic journal devoted to all aspects of Low Countries studies: history and art history, Dutch and Flemish (and occasionally Afrikaans) literary and cultural studies, Dutch language, Dutch as a foreign language, and intercultural and transnational studies. Its stated purpose is to cover "all aspects of 'Global Dutch', not only the Netherlands and the Dutch-speaking part of Belgium but also other places where Dutch historically had or continues to have an impact, including parts of the Americas, Southern Africa, and South-East Asia." A special focus concerns exchanges between the Low Countries and the English-speaking world in all periods from the late Middle Ages to the present day. Dutch Crossing is the official journal of the Association for Low Countries Studies."

History
Since 1977 the journal has been edited at the Department of Dutch, first at Bedford College, Regent’s Park, then since 1983 at University College London. From modest beginnings as a departmental magazine it developed into one of the main English language journals of interdisciplinary Low Countries studies, and in 1997 it became the journal of the Association for Low Countries Studies. In the 2009 Journal Awards of the Council of Editors of Learned Journals, Dutch Crossing received an honourable mention in the Phoenix Award for Significant Editorial Achievement. The journal is published by Maney Publishing and appears three times per year.

Name
The name 'Dutch Crossing' reflects the journal's focus on exchanges between the Low Countries and the Anglophone world, although the term, like many similar English expressions with 'Dutch' from the 17th century when the two countries were frequently at war, was originally meant pejoratively.

Abstracting and indexing
Dutch Crossing is abstracted in the ISI Web of Science databases and included in the initial lists for history and linguistics of the European Reference Index for the Humanities (ERIH) by the European Science Foundation (ESF). It is also abstracted and indexed in:
 Arts and Humanities Citation Index
 British Humanities Index
 EBSCO databases
 MLA databases
 Periodicals Index Online
 International Bibliography of Art
 Bibliography of the History of Art
 Bibliografie van de Nederlandse Taal- en Literatuurwetenschap
 Social Sciences Citation Index
 Current Contents/Arts and Humanities

References

External links
 
 Dutch Crossing ToC and abstract archive 1977-2010
 Ulrich Global Serials Directory: Review of Dutch Crossing (subscription needed)

European studies journals
Netherlandic studies
Publications established in 1977
Triannual journals
English-language journals
Routledge academic journals
Academic journals associated with learned and professional societies
Dutch studies journals